Boalda is a monotypic moth genus of the family Erebidae. Its only species, Boalda gyona, is known from the Brazilian state of Santa Catarina. Both the genus and the species were first described by Schaus in 1929.

References

Hypeninae
Monotypic moth genera